The Sound (formerly titled Lower Bay) is an independent Canadian psychological thriller film written by Jenna Mattison. The film is purportedly based on true events. The film stars Rose McGowan (in her final feature film role to date), Michael Eklund, Christopher Lloyd, and Richard Gunn. Filming began in Toronto in May 2015.

Direction of the film has been reported differently in sources to have been by Jenna Mattison, being her directorial debut, and by Nina Ljeti.

The eponymous "sound" in the film refers to infrasound, which plays a large role in the film.

Cast 
 Rose McGowan as Kelly Johansen, a best-selling author and paranormal investigator who is also a skeptic of the supernatural
 Michael Eklund as Detective John Richards,
 Christopher Lloyd as a maintenance man working in the station tunnels
 Richard Gunn as Ethan, Kelly's fiancé
 Jane Moffett
 Alex Braunstein
 Michael Giel

Production 
Principal photography on the film began in early May 2015 in Toronto.

Release 
The film was released in 2017.

References

External links 
 
 

2017 films
2017 horror thriller films
2017 psychological thriller films
Canadian horror thriller films
Canadian psychological thriller films
English-language Canadian films
Films shot in Toronto
Films set in Toronto
2010s English-language films
2010s Canadian films